Tut is a Canadian-American miniseries that premiered on U.S. cable network Spike on July 19, 2015. The three-part miniseries is based on the life of Egyptian pharaoh Tutankhamun.

Development 
Tut was first announced by Spike in May 2014. The miniseries marks a return by the network towards scripted programming, and in particular, "event" series that cater to a "balanced" audience (in contrast to the remainder of Spike's programming at the time, which has typically skewed towards a male audience). Such event series have also been recently popular among other networks, such as History. Tut is produced by Muse Entertainment, best known for its other miniseries The Kennedys and The Pillars of the Earth.

Cast

Main cast 
 Avan Jogia as Tutankhamun, the young Pharaoh of Egypt
 Ben Kingsley as Ay, the Grand Vizier.
 Nonso Anozie as General Horemheb, Tutankhamun's savvy and power hungry military strategist.
 Sibylla Deen as Ankhesenamun, the calculating and conniving sister-wife of Tutankhamun 
 Alexander Siddig as Amun, the High Priest, a major political figure who holds great influence in Tutankhamun's inner sanctum.
 Kylie Bunbury as Suhad, a beautiful and endearing girl of Mitanni descent, who unknowingly saves Tutankhamun's life and develops a strong bond with the Pharaoh.
 Peter Gadiot as Ka, King Tutankhamun's close confidant and seemingly loyal friend.
 Iddo Goldberg as Lagus, an Egyptian soldier who develops a special bond with Tutankhamun.
 Alistair Toovey as Nahkt, Ay's stepson.
 Steve Toussaint as Tushratta, king of the Mitanni.

Supporting cast 
 Kaizer Akhtar as young Tutankhamun.
 Silas Carson as Pharaoh Akhenaten, the father of Tutankhamun and Ankhesenamun.
 Steve Chusak as Paranefer, Akhenaten's servant.
 Alexander Lyras as General Yuya.
 Geoffrey Burton as Dagi, chief physician of the Egyptians.  
 Leon Lopez as Sete.
 Daniela Lavender as Herit.
 Ismail Kanater as the Priest of Sobek.

Episodes

Reception
The series has garnered mixed reviews, with a score of 46 on review aggregator Metacritic and 37% on review aggregator Rotten Tomatoes. Brian Lowery of Variety writes, "King Tutankhamun left behind a treasure trove of trinkets, but his nickname is all that's really required to serve as the cornerstone for Tut, the miniseries that unearths the Boy King in order to turn his short life into historical melodrama. Featuring Ben Kingsley as Tut's scheming vizier, surrounded by young actors often photographed as if this were a shampoo commercial, there are modest pleasures relating to the various palace intrigues, but only marginal momentum to drag an audience across three nights, provided they know enough about history to realize the title character won't be available for a sequel."

Robert Bianco of USA Today exclaims, "Tut miniseries is overstuffed melodrama." While, Keith Uhlich of The Hollywood Reporter writes, "Spike network's three-night miniseries about the Egyptian boy king Tutankhamun inspires no devotion."

References

External links 

2010s American drama television miniseries
2015 American television series debuts
2015 American television series endings
American biographical series
Cultural depictions of Tutankhamun
Erotic television series
Historical television series
Spike (TV network) original programming
Television shows set in ancient Egypt